Gove Airport  (also known as Gove-Nhulunbuy Airport) is on the Gove Peninsula in the Northern Territory of Australia. It services the mining town of Nhulunbuy and several Aboriginal communities including Yirrkala. It is operated by the Nhulunbuy Corporation.

Airnorth operates daily scheduled services to and from Darwin and Cairns and once weekly services to Groote Eylandt. Scheduled services are also operated by Mission Aviation Fellowship to local communities within the East Arnhem region.

The airport is a regional hub for air charter operations with various charter companies based and/or operating out of Gove. These include Air Arnhem, Marthakal Yolngu Airline, Katherine Aviation, Air Frontier, Black Diamond Aviation and Mission Aviation Fellowship.

History 

Gove Airport is located on the site of the former RAAF Base Gove. This World War II airbase was built in 1943 and named for Pilot Officer William Gove who was killed in action. During the war, the airfield was used by No. 83 Squadron RAAF flying CAC Boomerangs and No. 13 Squadron RAAF flying Lockheed Venturas, with No. 42 Squadron RAAF operating PBY Catalina flying boats out of nearby Drimmie Head. At the height of operations, over 5,000 servicemen were stationed at the base. The base closed in early 1946.

Facilities 

A new terminal building was completed in 2005, providing an air-conditioned departure lounge and indoor baggage collection.

Airlines and destinations

Statistics 
Gove Airport was ranked 61st in Australia for the number of revenue passengers served in financial year 2018–2019.

See also 
 List of airports in the Northern Territory

References

External links

Airports in the Northern Territory
Airports established in 1943